is a Japanese science fiction light novel series by Yū Yamaguchi that began serialization in 2011. It is released through the electronic magazine BOX-AiR, an imprint run by Kodansha Box. In December 2011, it was selected out of 11 winners of the New Author Awards to become the first BOX-AiR series to be animated. A short film adaptation (part of Anime Mirai 2013) by Zexcs debuted on March 2, 2013, directed by newcomer Tatsuya Yoshihara, who was previously an episode director for Sket Dance.

Plot
Set in 2022, technology has advanced to the point where the human nervous system can be seamlessly integrated into external networks thanks to nanomachines. People leave their bodies behind in water tanks while traversing through cyberspace. However, a crisis known as "Early Rapture" occurs where the system becomes overloaded, resulting in thousands of consciousnesses being lost in the network. Remu Mikage's sister Shiki is one of them, and in an attempt to look for her he visits her apartment. He encounters Shiki there, who informs him that the person he is speaking to isn't his sister, and has somehow taken over her body.

Characters

References

External links

2010s animated short films
2010s science fiction novels
2011 Japanese novels
Fiction set in 2022
Anime and manga based on light novels
Anime short films
Brain–computer interfacing in fiction
2010s Japanese-language films
Japanese science fiction novels
Kodansha books
Light novels
Science fiction anime and manga
Shōnen manga
Zexcs